Three Months Gone is a 1970 British play by Donald Howarth.

The original production at the Royal Court starred Diana Dors. The Financial Times said Dors "gives a stunning performance."  Her reviews were generally excellent and the film marked a comeback for her.

References

1970 in theatre